Rami Ali Yahya Al-Wasmani (born 1 February 1997) is a Yemeni footballer who plays as a defender for SDZ.

Career

Al-Wasmani started his career with Yemeni top flight side Al-Ahli (Sanaa). In 2021, he signed for SDZ in the Dutch sixth tier after trialing for Táborsko in the Czech third tier.

References

External links

 

1997 births
Al-Ahli Club Sana'a players
FC Silon Táborsko players
Association football defenders
Eerste Klasse players
Expatriate footballers in the Netherlands
Living people
Yemen international footballers
Yemeni expatriate footballers
Yemeni expatriates in the Netherlands
Yemeni footballers
Yemeni League players